Eris (dwarf planet)
Borderlands (series)
Project Hail Mary#Aboard Hail Mary